Anthony Ronald Yary (born July 16, 1946) is an American former professional football  player who played as an offensive tackle primarily for the Minnesota Vikings and also for the Los Angeles Rams in the National Football League (NFL).  He was elected to the College Football Hall of Fame in 1987 and the Pro Football Hall of Fame in 2001. Yary gave credit for his Pro Football Hall of Fame induction to his former coaches, John Ashton (high school) John McKay (college) and Bud Grant (professional). He also praised his position coaches Marv Goux, Dave Levy, John Michaels and Jerry Burns.

Early years
Yary attended Bellflower High School in Los Angeles County, California and then spent one season at Cerritos College in 1964. In October 2001, the school named the football field Ron Yary Stadium. While attending Bellflower High School, Yary starred in football, baseball, and basketball.

College career
Anthony Ronald Yary was born in Chicago and attended Cerritos College in the fall semester of 1964. He then in the spring semester of (1965) transferred to the University of Southern California, where he was a member of Phi Kappa Psi fraternity.  As a sophomore in 1965, Yary was voted the Pac-8 defensive lineman of the year and All-West Coast for his play at defensive tackle. As a junior, he was moved to the offensive line where he was a consensus All-American as a junior in 1966  and a unanimous All-American choice in 1967, his senior year. He was the 1967 winner of both the Outland Trophy and the Knute Rockne Award, awards that annually go to the nation's top collegiate lineman. Yary was the first USC Trojan to win the Outland. In Yary's senior year of 1967 the Trojans won the NCAA football national championship under Coach John McKay. During Yary's three seasons, the Trojans compiled a 24-7-1 record. In 1987 Yary was inducted to the College Football Hall of Fame. He was inducted into the Rose Bowl Hall of Fame on December 30, 2012, representing USC.

Professional career
Yary was the first overall pick of the 1968 NFL Draft by the Minnesota Vikings, who had  traded Fran Tarkenton to the New York Giants for that selection, becoming the first offensive lineman ever to be selected first overall. He played from 1968 to 1981 with the Minnesota Vikings, and 1982 with the Los Angeles Rams. During Yary's tenure with the Vikings, the team won 11 division titles. During that period, Minnesota won the 1969 NFL championship and NFC titles in 1973, 1974 and 1976, and played in Super Bowls IV, VIII, IX and XI where Yary was one of 11 Players to have played in all four games for the Vikings. Yary was named All-Pro 6 consecutive seasons (1971–76) and 2nd Team All-Pro in 1970 and 1977 and was an All-NFC choice from 1970 through 1977. He played in seven consecutive Pro Bowls, and was  a major force in a Minnesota team that was highly successful throughout the 1970s. In addition to his All-pro honors, Yary was voted the NFC Offensive Lineman of the Year three times (1973–75) by the NFLPA and was named the NFL Outstanding Blocker of the Year by the 1,000 yard Club for 1975.

Yary won the starting right tackle job (military duty forced him to miss first three games) on the Vikings offensive line in his second season and remained as a fixture at that spot throughout his Minnesota tenure. He was voted to the 1970s All-Decade First Team after the 1979 season.

Yary was also durable and played in spite of injuries. He missed only two games due to injuries—both coming in 1980 with a broken ankle—in 14 years in Minnesota. Later that same year, he continued to play in spite of a broken foot. He was inducted to the Vikings Ring of Honor in 2000. He became a member of the Pro Football Hall of Fame in 2001. He was the last offensive lineman to ever be drafted first overall until Orlando Pace was selected by Rams in 1997.

Personal life
Yary is married to his wife Jamie and has two sons, Jack (born 2001) and Grant (born 2005) and a daughter, Kinley (born c. 2010). Yary resides in Murrieta, California, and once co-owned a sports photography business with his brother Wayne, who bought Ron out in 2001. https://www.yaryphoto.com . His son Jack is a tight end for Murrieta Valley High School, and was committed to play at University of Washington before dropping out of the program.

References

External links
 
 

1946 births
Living people
American football offensive tackles
Cerritos Falcons football players
Los Angeles Rams players
Minnesota Vikings players
USC Trojans football players
All-American college football players
College Football Hall of Fame inductees
National Conference Pro Bowl players
National Football League first-overall draft picks
Pro Football Hall of Fame inductees
Sportspeople from Los Angeles County, California
People from Bellflower, California
Players of American football from Chicago
Players of American football from California